Happy Families is a traditional British card game usually with a specially made set of picture cards, featuring illustrations of fictional families of four, most often based on occupation types. The object of the game is to collect complete families, and the game is similar to Go Fish and Quartets.

In Germany and Austria, the game is known as Quartett or Ablegspiel (in Upper Austria and Styria) and is not restricted to sets of four people, but covers other topics such as farm animals or tractors. The game can also be adapted for use with an ordinary set of playing cards.

Gameplay

The player whose turn it is asks another player for a specific card: the asking player must hold a card of the same family. If the asked player has the card, they must give it to the requester, and the requester then takes another turn. If the asked player does not have the card, they say "not at home" and it becomes the asked player's turn.

When a player completes a family they place it face-down in front of them. Play continues in this way until no families are separated among different players. The player with the most completed families wins.

Development 
The game was devised by John Jaques Jr. who is also credited with popularizing tiddlywinks, ludo and snakes and ladders, and first published before the Great Exhibition of 1851. Cards following Jaques's original designs, with grotesque illustrations possibly by Sir John Tenniel (there was no official credit), are still being made.

Family members

The names of the family members are structured as follows, where X stands for a surname and Y for an occupation.
 Mr X the Y
 Mrs X the Y's Wife
 Master X the Y's Son
 Miss X the Y's Daughter

The eleven families in Jaques' original edition were:

In popular culture
The Happy Families children's storybooks, written by Allan Ahlberg, are titled in a similar way to the names of characters in this game.  In 1989 and 1990, Children's BBC aired a children's TV series based on the series of books.

See also
Old maid (card game)

References

19th-century card games
Dedicated deck card games
Card games for children
Quartet group